Panomifene (INN; developmental codes GYKI 13504 and EGIS 5650) is a nonsteroidal selective estrogen receptor modulator (SERM) of the triphenylethylene group related to tamoxifen that was under development as an antineoplastic agent by Egis Pharmaceuticals and IVAX Drug Research Institute in the 1990s for the treatment of breast cancer, but it was never marketed. It reached phase II clinical trials before development was terminated. The drug was described in 1981.

References

Abandoned drugs
Primary alcohols
Amines
Hormonal antineoplastic drugs
Trifluoromethyl compounds
Selective estrogen receptor modulators
Triphenylethylenes